"Black Bottom Stomp" is a jazz composition. It was composed by Jelly Roll Morton in 1925 and was originally entitled "Queen of Spades". It was recorded in Chicago by Morton and His Red Hot Peppers, for Victor Records on September 15, 1926. 


Technique
The recording has many features that are typical of the New Orleans style:  
the frontline of trumpet, clarinet and trombone and rhythm section comprising piano, banjo, double bass and drum kit
the structure, derived from multi-thematic ragtime structures, with a transitional interlude leading to a new key
collective improvisation ensemble sections, the main melody woven together with a counter-melody and the accompaniment
the counter-melody relies upon scalar patterns and arpeggios
the instrumental performance techniques such as the trombone counter-melody glissandos, sometimes known as "tailgating"
the percussive "slapped" bass used to help keep time in the rhythm section.

Structure 

John Szwed notes that in "Black Bottom Stomp," "Morton practiced what he preached, managing to incorporate in one short piece the 'Spanish tinge,' stomps, breaks, stoptime, backbeat, two-beat, four-beat, a complete suspension of the rhythm section during the piano solo, riffs, rich variations of melody, and dynamics of volume, all of the elements of jazz as he understood it."

 Intro: B♭ major, 8 bars, full ensemble
 A section in B♭.  Three 16 bar choruses: (i) full ensemble; (ii) trumpet calls with ensemble response; (iii) clarinet solo
 Interlude:  4 bars, for full ensemble
 B section in E♭:  Seven 20 bar choruses: (i) Full ensemble with trumpet and trombone break; (ii) clarinet solo (iii) piano solo; (iv) trumpet solo stop-time chorus; (v) banjo solo; (vi) full ensemble with drum break; (vii) full ensemble with trombone break
 Coda in E♭ for full ensemble

The harmonic basis is relatively simple, using standard II - V - I progressions. During the A section chorus, the chord progression passes through the relative minor.

With only seven instruments in the ensemble, Morton produces five distinct textures: 
trumpet and rhythm section
clarinet
banjo and rhythm section
clarinet and rhythm section
piano solo

The piece displays traits of Morton's compositional style: 
built-in breaks
stop-time phrases
rhythmically lively themes
frequent contrasts of sustained semibreve phrases with syncopated semibreve patterns
a stomping "trio" section

Some distinct rhythmic features of New Orleans jazz appear throughout:
2-beat mixed with 4-beat time
stop-time
Charleston rhythm

Performers
The performers on the original recording were: 
Clarinet: Omer Simeon
Trumpet: George Mitchell
Trombone: Kid Ory
Piano: Jelly Roll Morton
Banjo: Johnny St. Cyr
Double Bass: John Lindsay
Drums: Andrew Hilaire

See also
Black Bottom (disambiguation)

References

Sources 
 Burton W. Peretti (2006), "“Black Bottom Stomp”--Jelly Roll Morton’s Red Hot Peppers (1926)" Library of Congress Registry of Recorded Sound.

Jazz compositions
Songs written by Jelly Roll Morton
1925 songs
United States National Recording Registry recordings